Çağla Şimşek (born 1 August 2002) is a Turkish actress.

Life and career
Çağla Şimşek was born on 1 August 2002 in Istanbul. Her father is from Samsun while her mother is from Gümüşhane. Şimşek's talent was discovered by actor Osman Yağmurdereli, after which she made her television debut as a child actress with the TV series Elveda Derken, playing the role of Naz.

On her debut as an actress, she said:

She continued her career with her roles in the series Kırmızı Işık (2008), fantasy child series Kayıp Prenses (2008–2009) and Cuma'ya Kalsa(2010) with Haluk Bilginer. In 2011, she portrayed the character of Lavin in the series Hayat Devam Ediyor. Her breakthrough came with her role as Zehra in the series Küçük Gelin, after which she rose to prominence.

Filmography

References

External links 
 
 
 

2002 births
Living people
Actresses from Istanbul
Turkish child actresses
Turkish television actresses
Turkish film actresses